QHE may refer to:

 Quantum Hall effect, a quantized version of the Hall effect
 QHE, the Pinyin code for Qinghe railway station, Haidian District, Beijing